is a Japanese film director.

Filmography
 Star Reformer (2006)
 Suspect X (2008)
 Amalfi: Rewards of the Goddess (2009)
 Andalucia: Revenge of the Goddess (2011)
 Midsummer's Equation (2013)
 Hirugao (2017)
 At the end of the Matinee (2019)
 The Hound of the Baskervilles (2022)
 Silent Parade (2022)

References

External links

1962 births
Japanese film directors
Living people